The 2013 Philippine Peace Cup was the second edition of the tournament, an international football competition organized by the Philippine Football Federation (PFF) to celebrate peace month in the country through football.  This edition involved the national teams of the Philippines and only two invitees instead of three.  It was held in Bacolod, Negros Occidental from October 11–15, 2013.

Participants
New Caledonia, Kyrgyzstan and an unspecified team from the 2012 Philippine Peace Cup were initially mooted as participants.  On September 24, the PFF announced that Chinese Taipei, runners-up in the previous edition of the tournament had confirmed their participation.  They also sent an invitation to the Federation of Uganda Football Associations, but they turned it down citing the expensive airfare and the bad timing due to having other commitments.

The Rwandese Association Football Federation (FERWAFA) were another invitee and the PFF claimed that they were close to finalizing their participation.  However, the FERWAFA stated that they hadn't made any decision and had to check if they had budget to compete in the tournament.  On September 27, the FERWAFA confirmed that they had arranged an international friendly match against Uganda on October 15, thus ruling them out of the tournament.  

The following day, it was announced that Pakistan would be participating in the tournament.  The PFF then stated that only three teams would be involved.  Burundi and 2013 SAFF Championship winners Afghanistan were also considered as invitees.

Venue

Squads

Matches

All times listed are UTC+8.

Awards

Goalscorers
1 goal

 Li Mao
 Lin Chang-lun
 Zesh Rehman
 Kalim Ullah
 Chris Greatwich
 Patrick Reichelt
 Stephan Schröck
 James Younghusband

References

   
2013
2013 in Philippine football